The following low-power television stations broadcast on digital or analog channel 30 in the United States:

 K21IF-D in Hanksville, Utah
 K30AE-D in Alva, Oklahoma
 K30AF-D in Alexandria, Minnesota
 K30AL-D in Iola, Kansas
 K30BN-D in Coos Bay, Oregon
 K30BU-D in Leadore, Idaho
 K30CN-D in Ely, Nevada
 K30DC-D in Dove Creek, etc., Colorado
 K30DS-D in Lovelock, Nevada
 K30DT-D in Flagstaff, Arizona
 K30EJ-D in Crested Butte, Colorado
 K30EK-D in Dulce & Lumberton, New Mexico
 K30EW-D in Monument, etc., Oregon
 K30FN-D in St. James, Minnesota
 K30FO-D in Peetz, Colorado
 K30FP-D in Santa Rosa, New Mexico
 K30FS-D in Hawthorne, Nevada
 K30FV-D in Cambridge, Nebraska
 K30FY-D in Guymon, Oklahoma
 K30FZ-D in Willmar, Minnesota
 K30GA-D in Garfield County, Utah
 K30GG-D in Chloride, Arizona
 K30GJ-D in Colfax, New Mexico
 K30GL-D in Many Farms, Arizona
 K30GM-D in Capitan/Ruidoso, New Mexico
 K30GO-D in Pleasant Valley, Colorado
 K30GU-D in Morongo Valley, California
 K30GV-D in Shoshoni, Wyoming
 K30HA-D in Yuma, Colorado
 K30HB-D in Agana, Guam
 K30HD-D in Tucumcari, New Mexico
 K30HH-D in Memphis, Texas
 K30HJ-D in Cortez, etc., Colorado
 K30HY-D in Verdi/Mogul, Nevada
 K30JB-D in Morgan, etc., Utah
 K30JD-D in Prescott, Arizona
 K30JE-D in Lihue, Hawaii
 K30JG-D in Randolph & Woodruff, Utah
 K30JM-D in Colorado Springs, Colorado
 K30JP-D in Sayre, Oklahoma
 K30JQ-D in Carbondale, Colorado
 K30JS-D in Yreka, California
 K30JT-D in La Pine, Oregon
 K30KC-D in Samak, Utah
 K30KE-D in Wanship, Utah
 K30KG-D in Coalville, etc., Utah
 K30KH-D in Emery, Utah
 K30KJ-D in Manti & Ephrain, Utah
 K30KK-D in Fountain Green, Utah
 K30KM-D in Vernal, etc., Utah
 K30KQ-D in Jackson, Minnesota
 K30KU-D in Silver City, New Mexico
 K30KV-D in Crownpoint, New Mexico
 K30KX-D in Taos, New Mexico
 K30KY-D in Philipsburg, Montana
 K30LB-D in Beowawe, Nevada
 K30LC-D in Tampico, etc., Montana
 K30LD-D in Wichita Falls, Texas
 K30LF-D in Duchesne, Utah
 K30LL-D in Kingman, Arizona
 K30LS-D in Sandpoint, Idaho
 K30LY-D in Manila, etc., Utah
 K30MC-D in Lewiston, Idaho
 K30MG-D in Kirksville, Missouri
 K30MH-D in Overton, Nevada
 K30MJ-D in Libby, Montana
 K30MM-D in Gila River Indian Community, Arizona
 K30MN-D in Barstow, California
 K30MW-D in Sweetgrass, etc., Montana
 K30MX-D in Wyodak, Wyoming
 K30NY-D in Victorville, etc., California
 K30OA-D in Milton-Freewater, Oregon
 K30OC-D in Cottage Grove, Oregon
 K30OE-D in Alton, Utah
 K30OF-D in Baker Valley, Oregon
 K30OG-D in La Grande, Oregon
 K30OI-D in Camp Verde, Arizona
 K30OJ-D in Las Vegas, New Mexico
 K30OK-D in Tulsa, Oklahoma
 K30OL-D in Washington, etc., Utah
 K30OM-D in Monterey, California
 K30ON-D in Capitol Reef National Park, Utah
 K30OO-D in Caineville, Utah
 K30OQ-D in Fremont, Utah
 K30OR-D in Escalante, Utah
 K30OT-D in Tropic/Cannonville, Utah
 K30OU-D in Cody, etc., Wyoming
 K30OV-D in Boulder, Utah
 K30OW-D in Fishlake Resort, Utah
 K30OX-D in Montpelier, Idaho
 K30OY-D in Logan, Utah
 K30PA-D in Roseau, Minnesota
 K30PB-D in Shurz, Nevada
 K30PC-D in Henefer & Echo, Utah
 K30PD-D in Kanab, Utah
 K30PE-D in Parowan, Enoch etc., Utah
 K30PF-D in Fillmore etc., Utah
 K30PG-D in Delta/Oak City, etc, Utah
 K30PH-D in Beaver, etc., Utah
 K30PI-D in Garrison, Utah
 K30PJ-D in Beryl/New Castle/Modena, Utah
 K30PK-D in Kanarraville, etc., Utah
 K30PM-D in Price, Utah
 K30PN-D in Green River, Utah
 K30PO-D in Scofield, Utah
 K30PP-D in Ferron, Utah
 K30PQ-D in Clear Creek, Utah
 K30PR-D in Pahrump, Nevada
 K30PT-D in Kalispell & Lakeside, Montana
 K30PW-D in Salmon, Idaho
 K30PX-D in Winnemucca, Nevada
 K30PY-D in Parlin, Colorado
 K30PZ-D in Litchfield, California
 K30QA-D in Coeur D'Alene, Idaho
 K30QB-D in Shreveport, Louisiana
 K30QC-D in Ridgecrest, California
 K30QD-D in Ontario, etc., Oregon
 K30QE-D in Panaca, Nevada
 K30QG-D in Alexandria, Louisiana
 K30QH-D in Burley, etc., Idaho
 K30QI-D in Alamogordo, New Mexico
 K30QV-D in Iowa, Louisiana
 K30QX-D in Duluth, Minnesota
 K30QY-D in Oakland, Minnesota
 K30RA-D in Racine, Minnesota
 K38MK-D in Cheyenne Wells, Colorado
 K40IX-D in Antimony, Utah
 KAHC-LD in Sacramento, California
 KBZO-LD in Lubbock, Texas
 KCAU-TV in Sioux City, Iowa
 KDFS-CD in Santa Maria, California
 KDNU-LD in Las Vegas, Nevada
 KFOL-CD in Houma, Louisiana
 KGBD-LD in Great Bend, Kansas
 KKAF-LD in Fayetteville, Arkansas
 KKPD-LD in Tyler, Texas
 KLPD-LD in Denver, Colorado
 KMBB-LD in North Platte, Nebraska
 KOAB-TV in Warm Springs, Oregon
 KOTV-DT in Caney, Kansas
 KPLE-CD in Killeen, Texas
 KQFX-LD in Columbia, Missouri
 KQSY-LD in Corpus Christi, Texas
 KSMI-LD in Wichita, Kansas
 KUNW-CD in Yakima, Washington
 KWPL-LD in Santa Fe, New Mexico
 KXJB-LD in Fargo, North Dakota
 KXKW-LD in Lafayette, Louisiana
 KZCO-LD in Denver, Colorado, uses KLPD-LD's spectrum
 W30BU-D in Green Bay, Wisconsin
 W30CO-D in Wheeling, West Virginia
 W30CS-D in Zionville, North Carolina
 W30CV-D in Hilton Head Island, South Carolina
 W30DM-D in Manchester, etc., Vermont
 W30DN-D in Manteo, North Carolina
 W30DZ-D in Fence, Wisconsin
 W30EB-D in Kingston, Pennsylvania
 W30ED-D in Guayama, Puerto Rico
 W30EE-D in Jacksonville, Florida
 W30EF-D in Jefferson, North Carolina
 W30EG-D in Knoxville, Tennessee
 W30EH-D in Fort Wayne, Indiana
 W30EI-D in Sharon, Pennsylvania
 W30EM-D in Ocala, Florida
 W30ES-D in Columbus, Mississippi
 W30ET-D in Flint, Michigan
 W30EZ-D in Purvis, Mississippi
 W30FA-D in Jasper, Florida
 WAGT-CD in Augusta, Georgia
 WAWW-LD in Rochester, New York
 WAXN-CG in China Grove, North Carolina
 WBUD-LD in Atlanta, Georgia
 WBUO-LD in Olean, New York
 WCRN-LD in Boston, Massachusetts
 WCZS-LD in Chambersburg, Pennsylvania
 WDCI-LD in Chicago, Illinois
 WDGA-CD in Dalton, Georgia
 WELW-LD in Evansville, Indiana
 WFWG-LD in Richmond, Virginia
 WHIG-CD in Rocky Mount, North Carolina
 WIAV-CD in Washington, D.C., an ATSC 3.0 station
 WLFT-CD in Baton Rouge, Louisiana
 WLOW-LD in Charleston, South Carolina
 WNJJ-LD in New York, New York
 WNYN-LD in New York, New York
 WODK-LD in St. Louis, Missouri
 WPCW (DRT) in Johnstown, Pennsylvania
 WPTG-CD in Pittsburgh, Pennsylvania
 WQEK-LD in Clarksdale, Mississippi
 WRMD-CD in Tampa, Florida
 WSDI-LD in Indianapolis, Indiana
 WSPY-LD in Earlville, Illinois
 WSVW-LD in Harrisonburg, Virginia
 WVCZ-LD in Valdosta, Georgia
 WVIZ (DRT) in Cleveland, Ohio
 WVUP-CD in Tallahassee, Florida
 WVWW-LD in Vero Beach, Florida
 WWDT-CD in Naples, Florida
 WXII-LD in Cedar, Michigan
 WXMI in Kalamazoo, Michigan
 WYNB-LD in Ellenville, New York
 WZCD-LD in Cincinnati-Dayton, Ohio

The following low-power stations, which are no longer licensed, formerly broadcast on analog channel 30:
 K30BQ in Needles, California
 K30CD in Carlin, Nevada
 K30CR in Fraser, etc., Colorado
 K30DK in Bemidji, Minnesota
 K30ET in Fairbanks, Alaska
 K30FL-D in Port Angeles, Washington
 K30HF in Beowawe, Nevada
 K30IU in Grand Junction, Colorado
 K30IV-D in Wallowa, Oregon
 K30KB in Farmington, New Mexico
 K30KN-D in Wyola, Montana
 K30KR-D in Boise, Idaho
 K30MF-D in Jonesboro, Arkansas
 K30MI-D in Redding, California
 K30MY-D in Jackson, Wyoming
 K30QF-D in Hermiston, Washington
 K30QW-D in Geronimo, Oklahoma
 KAMM-LP in Amarillo, Texas
 KBAD-LD in Pago Pago, American Samoa
 KCIO-LD in Ontario, California
 KCLJ-LP in Joplin, Missouri
 KEGS-LP in Las Vegas, Nevada
 KGLR-LP in Lubbock, Texas
 KHTX-LP in Huntsville, Texas
 KLCP-LP in Las Cruces, New Mexico
 KPVT-LP in Pahrump, Nevada
 KZVE-LP in Littlefield, Arizona
 W30BV in Norfolk, Virginia
 W30CC in Natchez, Mississippi
 W30CH in Clarksburg, West Virginia
 W30DW-D in Tifton, Georgia
 W30EX-D in Lima, Ohio
 WBVT-LP in Burlington, Vermont
 WCKD-LP in Bangor/Dedham, Maine
 WLPD-LP in Plano, Illinois
 WNNB-CD in Beaver, Pennsylvania
 WTBS-LD in Atlanta, Georgia

References

30 low-power